The 15th Golden Bell Awards was held on 26 March 1980 at the Sun Yat-sen Memorial Hall in Taipei, Taiwan. The ceremony was broadcast by Chinese Television System (CTS).

Winners

References

1980
1980 in Taiwan